North Brother Island Light was a lighthouse located on North Brother Island in the East River in New York City. The lighthouse was at the southern tip of the island. Before the lighthouse was erected, the island was uninhabited and saw no formal use. The tower utilized an occulting light which lit for five seconds and eclipsed for five seconds. It stood 47 feet above the water.

Notes

Lighthouses completed in 1869
Lighthouses in New York City
East River
1869 establishments in New York (state)
Transportation buildings and structures in the Bronx
Government buildings in the Bronx